Marietta High School (MHS) is a four-year, public, secondary school in Marietta, Ohio, United States. The school serves students in the Marietta City School District in grades nine through twelve. As of 2021–2021, the enrollment was approximately 1,100. Marietta's mascot is Tabby the tiger and its colors are orange and black. The school participates in both the Ohio Valley Athletic Conference and Twin State League.

MHS is accredited by the North Central Association of Colleges and Secondary Schools and the Ohio Department of Education.

History
The current building first opened as a replacement for what is now Marietta Middle School. The auditorium/gymnasium and "vo-ag" buildings were part of the original construction. As enrollment increased, more parking lots were added as well.

The school converted from a seven-period day to an eight-period day during the 2010–2011 school year.

In 2013 a million dollar project took place that included closing in the breezeway between the auditorium/gymnasium building and the main school building. Also in this project, a new section to the school building was added so that all classes would be in the main school building, converting the Vo-Ag building into an administrative office.

The "Isaac Danford Memorial Weight Room" was founded in 2015

Extracurricular activities

MHS offers numerous clubs/groups, including a wide array of sports teams including men's basketball, soccer, football, tennis, track, cross country and swimming. Woman's athletics include soccer, volleyball, cheer, softball, swimming and basketball. Students also have the opportunity to participate in the making of the school yearbook "The Orian" and a school newspaper entitled The Original is a monthly publication printed by The Marietta Times, the city's local daily newspaper. There is also a student Web-Design team at the high school called "The Bridge". They also have the Marietta High School "Wall of Sound" Marching Band who competes at band competitions, and local parades and events. The school also has an a cappella singing group, "Vocal Point," that performs locally. The school also puts on a yearly musical, which is open to all students in the school district. Other clubs and groups include the Theatre Club, National Honor Society, Model United Nations, Key Club, Concert and Jazz Band, Indoor Percussion, Cantabile Choir, Apprentice Choir, Civil War club, Future Farmers of America, Math Club, Science Olympiad, Spanish Honor Society, Tri-M Music Honor Society, Students Against Destructive Decisions (SADD) Club, Student Council, and Environmental Awareness Club.

Notable alumni
 Andrew Cayton, noted historian and professor of early America
 Brian T. Moynihan, (Class of 1977) Chairman and CEO of Bank of America
 Andy Thompson, (class of 1981), Ohio state representative

References

External links

High schools in Washington County, Ohio
Buildings and structures in Marietta, Ohio
Public high schools in Ohio